The 1997–98 Sheffield Shield season was the 96th season of the Sheffield Shield, the domestic first-class cricket competition of Australia. Western Australia won the championship.

Table

Final

References

Sheffield Shield
Sheffield Shield
Sheffield Shield seasons